David Albelda Aliqués (born 1 September 1977) is a Spanish retired footballer who played as a defensive midfielder, currently a manager.

He played mainly for local Valencia during his extensive professional career, being team captain for over a decade and appearing in 480 competitive matches.

A Spanish international in the 2000s, Albelda won 51 caps for the country, representing it in two World Cups and at Euro 2004.

Club career
Born in La Pobla Llarga, Valencian Community, Albelda started his career as a central defender with local UD Alzira and, after having served two separate loans with Villarreal CF, also in the region, returned for good to first professional club Valencia CF in the 1999–2000 season, playing a major role in a squad that was crowned La Liga champions in 2002 and 2004, adding to that the 2004 UEFA Cup; since summer 2001, with Gaizka Mendieta's departure, he was also awarded team captaincy.

Albelda, along with teammates Santiago Cañizares and Miguel Ángel Angulo was axed from the squad on 20 December 2007 by recently arrived coach Ronald Koeman; in the captain's case, he had ironically just renewed his link with the Che until 2011. In response, on 2 January 2008, Albelda's lawyer claimed that Valencia had ignored his client's plea for an amicable end to the player's contract, with legal recourse the only possible avenue left. With news of this hitting the media, several teams, although he would not be able to join any Spanish team for the remainder of the season, having played more than four league games, studied the possibility of signing him in the winter transfer window, with hopes of a free transfer.

In late April 2008, however, with Koeman's dismissal, all three were reinstated by new manager Voro in a squad seriously threatened with relegation, with five remaining rounds. He returned to action in the second half of the 6–0 away loss against FC Barcelona on 4 May, and received his first post-reinstatement start in a 5–1 victory in the derby away at Levante UD the following week, as the side mathematically retained top-flight status.

For 2008–09, Albelda remained a regular fixture alongside longtime central midfield teammate Rubén Baraja. On 10 January 2009 he delivered an outstanding performance at right back, replacing suspended Miguel in a 3–3 home derby against Villarreal.

Albelda was played intermittently by Valencia from 2010 to 2013, also suffering several injury problems. On 10 June 2013, it was announced that the 35-year-old would not renew his contract with the club, leaving as a free agent; he announced his retirement two months later.

On 29 May 2019, Albelda was appointed manager of Tercera División side Atzeneta UE. He led them to their first-ever promotion to Segunda División B on 26 July 2020, after beating CD Alcoyano in the play-offs.

On 24 May 2021, after being immediately relegated, Albelda left the club.

International career
A Spanish international since 5 September 2001, in 2–0 away win against Liechtenstein for the 2002 FIFA World Cup qualifiers, Albelda was part of the Spanish squad in the 2002 and 2006 FIFA World Cups. He also played in UEFA Euro 2004.

After having been ousted from the Valencia squad, Albelda would still be called by national team boss Luis Aragonés to a 6 February 2008 friendly with France. He would eventually not make the final cut for Euro 2008, as Spain emerged victorious.

Albelda also won a silver medal at the 2000 Summer Olympics in Sydney, and represented his nation at the 1997 FIFA World Youth Championship.

Personal life
Albelda married Spanish model and presenter Vicen Fernández in 2007.

Career statistics

Club

1 Included 5 appearances and 1 goal in Segunda División promotion play-off 1996

2 Included 2 appearances in La Liga relegation play-off 1999

3 Included 2 appearances and 1 goal in Supercopa de Espana 1999

4 Included 2 appearances in Supercopa de Espana 2004 and 1 appearance in UEFA Super Cup 2004

5 Included 2 appearances in Supercopa de Espana 2008

International
Appearances and goals by national team and year

Honours
Valencia
La Liga: 2001–02, 2003–04
Supercopa de España: 1999
UEFA Cup: 2003–04
UEFA Super Cup: 2004
UEFA Champions League runner-up: 1999–2000, 2000–01

Spain U23
Summer Olympics silver medal: 2000

References

External links

CiberChe stats and bio 

1977 births
Living people
People from Ribera Alta (comarca)
Sportspeople from the Province of Valencia
Spanish footballers
Footballers from the Valencian Community
Association football midfielders
La Liga players
Segunda División players
Segunda División B players
Valencia CF Mestalla footballers
Valencia CF players
Villarreal CF players
UEFA Cup winning players
Spain youth international footballers
Spain under-21 international footballers
Spain under-23 international footballers
Spain international footballers
2002 FIFA World Cup players
2006 FIFA World Cup players
UEFA Euro 2004 players
Olympic footballers of Spain
Footballers at the 2000 Summer Olympics
Olympic silver medalists for Spain
Olympic medalists in football
Medalists at the 2000 Summer Olympics
Spanish football managers
Segunda División B managers
Tercera División managers